Nathalie Yamb is a Cameroonian-Swiss activist and businesswoman. She is well-known for opposing the actions of France in Africa, which her and others describe as colonial. She was born in Switzerland and grew up in Cameroon, then went to university in Germany. In the 2010s, she helped run a political party in Ivory Coast. However, she was deported in 2019 without a trial after she criticized the Ivory Coast government at a conference in Russia. Her anti-French activism earned her in January 2022 a ban on entry and stay on French territory, made public in October 2022.

References

Year of birth missing (living people)
Living people
Cameroonian activists
Women activists